Kellogg may refer to:

People and organizations
Kellogg's, American multinational food-manufacturing company
Will Keith Kellogg, founder of the company
John Harvey Kellogg, his brother, inventor of cornflakes and medical practitioner 
Kellogg Brothers, 19th century lithographers of Hartford, Connecticut
Kellogg (name), including a list of people with the surname

Places
Kellogg, Idaho
Kellogg, Iowa
Kellogg, Kansas
Kellogg, Minnesota
Kellogg, Missouri
Kellogg, Oregon

See also
Kellogg Interchange, a freeway interchange in Southern California
Kellogg Avenue, the popular name for the U.S. Route 54 and U.S. Route 400 freeway through Wichita, Kansas. Originally named after Milo B. Kellogg, the city's first civilian postmaster and founder of: 
Kellogg Switchboard & Supply Company, telephone equipment manufacturer
KBR (company), formerly Kellogg, Brown and Root, an American engineering and construction company
Kellogg College, Oxford, one of the constituent colleges of Oxford University
Kellogg Community College campuses in southwest Michigan
Kellogg School of Management at Northwestern University
Kellogg School of Science and Technology, a graduate school in La Jolla, California
W. K. Kellogg Foundation, a philanthropic, non-profit organization
Kellogg–Briand Pact, a 1928 multinational anti-war pact
Kellog, a rural locality (a settlement) in Krasnoyarsk Krai, Russia
Justice Kellogg (disambiguation)